Thomas Sorensen (born April 6, 1971, in Racine, Wisconsin) is a former American volleyball player, who was a member of the United States men's national volleyball team at the 1996 Summer Olympics in Atlanta, Georgia.

Sorenson graduated from Racine Case High School in Racine, Wisconsin. A liberal arts major at Pepperdine University, the 1991 FIVB World League was the first event he competed in as a national team member.  Tom currently serves as an assistant volleyball coach for both the men's and women's teams at Ottawa University in Kansas.

References

External links
 Profile at The Washington Post

1971 births
Living people
American men's volleyball players
Volleyball players at the 1996 Summer Olympics
Olympic volleyball players of the United States
Sportspeople from Racine, Wisconsin
Pan American Games silver medalists for the United States
Pan American Games medalists in volleyball
Volleyball players at the 1995 Pan American Games
Medalists at the 1995 Pan American Games
Pepperdine Waves men's volleyball players